Moore's Fort is a twin dogtrot type blockhouse in Round Top, Texas. Built by John Henry Moore in 1828, it is the oldest building in Fayette County. It was originally located where La Grange is today, as a shelter for settlers from Comanche raids. Later it was moved to Round Top. A historical marker sits at the original location in La Grange.

References

External links
Entry on Moore and his fort via Google Books: Gunfights & Sites in Texas Ranger History by Mike Cox, Arcadia Publishing, South Carolina, 2015. Accessed 2 December 2015.

Forts in Texas
Buildings and structures in Fayette County, Texas
Infrastructure completed in 1828
Mexican Texas